The 2014–15 Texas State Bobcats men's basketball team represented Texas State University during the 2014–15 NCAA Division I men's basketball season. The Bobcats, led by second year head coach Danny Kaspar, played their home games at Strahan Coliseum and were members of the Sun Belt Conference. They finished the season 14–17, 7–13 to finish in ninth place. They advanced to the quarterfinals of the Sun Belt tournament where they lost to Louisiana–Lafayette.

Roster

Schedule

|-
!colspan=9 style="background:#500000; color:white;"| Exhibition

|-
!colspan=9 style="background:#500000; color:white;"| Regular season

|-
!colspan=9 style="background:#500000; color:white;"|Sun Belt tournament

References

Texas State Bobcats men's basketball seasons
Texas State
2014 in sports in Texas